The 1992 United States Senate election in Maryland was held on November 3, 1992. Incumbent Democratic U.S. Senator Barbara Mikulski won re-election to a second term.

Democratic primary

Candidates
 Barbara Mikulski, incumbent U.S. Senator
 Thomas M. Wheatley
 Walter Boyd
 Don Allensworth
 Scott David Britt
 James Leonard White
 Emerson Sweatt

Results

Republican primary

Candidates
 James H. Berry
 John J. Bishop, Jr., Maryland State Senator
 Joseph I. Cassilly, Harford County State's Attorney
 Herman J. Hannan
 Stuart Hopkins
 Joyce Friend-Nalepka
 Alan Keyes, former Assistant Secretary of State for International Organization Affairs and nominee in 1988
 Martha Scanlan Klima, Maryland State Delegate
 Scott L. Meredith
 Ross Zimmerman Pierpont, perennial candidate
 Edward R. Shannon
 S. Rob Sobhani, aide to Congresswoman Connie Morella
 Romie A. Songer
 Gene Zarwell, retired U.S. Army Colonel

Results

General election

Candidates
 Alan Keyes (R), former Assistant Secretary of State for International Organization Affairs
 Barbara Mikulski (D), incumbent U.S. Senator

Results

See also
 1992 United States Senate elections

References

1992 Maryland elections
Maryland
1992